Rebecca Vivian Mary Perrott  (born 20 June 1961) is a swimmer from New Zealand, who won the gold medal in the women's 200 metres freestyle at the 1978 Commonwealth Games. She was fourth in the women's 400m freestyle at the 1976 Summer Olympics.

In the 1980 New Year Honours, Perrott was appointed a Member of the Order of the British Empire, for services to swimming. She was considered a possible medallist for the 1980 Summer Olympics but was denied the opportunity due to the boycott by the majority of New Zealand Olympic sports associations. 

At 15 she was the youngest person to represent New Zealand at the Olympics. At 12½ she was the youngest competitor at the 1974 British Commonwealth Games; swimming for Fiji as her father was Registrar at the University of the South Pacific.

In 1994 she won a silver medal at the world surf championships in Britain. In 2011, she broke six New Zealand Masters swimming records.

See also
 List of Commonwealth Games medallists in swimming (women)

References

External links
 New Zealand Olympic Committee 
 
 
 

1961 births
Living people
New Zealand female swimmers
Olympic swimmers of New Zealand
Commonwealth Games gold medallists for New Zealand
Commonwealth Games silver medallists for New Zealand
Commonwealth Games bronze medallists for New Zealand
New Zealand female freestyle swimmers
Swimmers at the 1976 Summer Olympics
Swimmers from Wellington City
Fijian female swimmers
Swimmers at the 1978 Commonwealth Games
Commonwealth Games competitors for Fiji
Swimmers at the 1974 British Commonwealth Games
People educated at Wellington Girls' College
New Zealand expatriates in Fiji
Commonwealth Games medallists in swimming
New Zealand Members of the Order of the British Empire
20th-century New Zealand women
21st-century New Zealand women
Medallists at the 1978 Commonwealth Games